Bernd Rohr (13 November 1937 – 5 December 2022) was a German racing cyclist. He notably won the amateur team pursuit at the 1962 UCI Track Cycling World Championships alongside Ehrenfried Rudolph, and Lothar Claesges.

References

1937 births
2022 deaths
Sportspeople from Mannheim
German male cyclists
German track cyclists
UCI Track Cycling World Champions (men)
Recipients of the Silver Laurel Leaf